In enzymology, a glycine C-acetyltransferase is an enzyme that catalyzes the chemical reaction:

acetyl-CoA + glycine  CoA + 2-amino-3-oxobutanoate

Thus, the two substrates of this enzyme are acetyl-CoA and glycine, whereas its two products are CoA and 2-amino-3-oxobutanoate.

This enzyme belongs to the family of transferases, specifically those acyltransferases transferring groups other than aminoacyl groups.  The systematic name of this enzyme class is acetyl-CoA:glycine C-acetyltransferase. Other names in common use include 2-amino-3-ketobutyrate CoA ligase, 2-amino-3-ketobutyrate coenzyme A ligase, 2-amino-3-ketobutyrate-CoA ligase, glycine acetyltransferase, and aminoacetone synthase.  This enzyme participates in glycine, serine and threonine metabolism.  It employs one cofactor, pyridoxal phosphate.

Structural studies

As of late 2007, only one structure has been solved for this class of enzymes, with the PDB accession code .

Human genes

 GCAT

References

 

EC 2.3.1
Pyridoxal phosphate enzymes
Enzymes of known structure